Roger Tattersall (12 March 1952 – 24 April 2020) was an English cricketer.  Tattersall was a left-handed batsman who bowled left-arm medium pace.  He was born at Nelson, Lancashire, and was educated at The Leys School.
 
Tattersall made two first-class appearances for Lancashire in 1971, against Warwickshire at Old Trafford, and Sussex at the County Ground, Hove.  He wasn't called upon to bat in either match, while with the ball he took just one wicket.  In that same season he also made a single List A appearance against Middlesex at Lord's in the John Player league, scoring one run and going wicketless with the ball.

He also played in the Lancashire League for Nelson.

References

External links
Roger Tattersall at ESPNcricinfo
Roger Tattersall at CricketArchive

1952 births
2020 deaths
People from Nelson, Lancashire
People educated at The Leys School
English cricketers
Lancashire cricketers